Viktor Fedotov is a Russian-British businessman. He was a vice-president of Lukoil in 1990-1998 and headed a number of other companies in the Russian oil industry, including the Caspian Pipeline Consortium.  He is now the majority owner of Aquind, a company that plans to build a HVDC submarine power cable that would link France and England.

Aquind donated more than £1 million to the Conservative Party. After Fedotov's link with Aquind was discovered, the Conservative Party was criticised for accepting these donations by Angela Rayner, Labour’s deputy leader, and by Conservative MPs.

According to the Guardian, documents from Pandora Papers suggest that he was one of the owners of the Russian company VNIIST and "made at least $98m from an offshore financial structure that appears to have funnelled profits from VNIIST via multiple tax havens."

Fedotov owns a £7 million house in Hampshire.

References

Living people
Russian emigrants to the United Kingdom
Russian businesspeople in the oil industry
Conservative Party (UK) donors
Year of birth missing (living people)
Russian businesspeople in the United Kingdom